Alexander Povetkin vs. Dillian Whyte II, billed as Rumble On The Rock, was a heavyweight professional boxing rematch contested between the former WBA (Regular) champion and defending WBC interim champion Alexander Povetkin, and former WBC interim champion Dillian Whyte. The event was originally set to take place on 21 November 2020, however was postponed when Povetkin tested positive for COVID-19. A venue had not initially been confirmed for the rematch, but the bout took place in Gibraltar on 27 March 2021. Their first fight ended with a fifth-round technical knockout victory for Povetkin.  In this rematch, Whyte gained his revenge by knocking out Povetkin in the fourth round. The fight would ultimately be the last of Povetkin's career, as he announced his retirement soon afterwards aged 41 on 13 June 2021.

Fight card

Broadcasting
The Undercard will be televised for a 30-minute Freeview on Sky Sports Arena, Sky Sports Mix and Sky Sports Boxing YouTube The fight will be televised live on Sky Sports Box Office PPV in the United Kingdom and Ireland, as well as REN TV in Russia.

- the coverage is not available in UK, IRL, and selected countries.

See also 

 Dillian Whyte vs. Alexander Povetkin

References 

2021 in boxing
Sky Sports
Boxing matches
2021 in Gibraltarian sport
March 2021 sports events in Europe